Jorge Reyes may refer to:
Jorge Reyes (musician) (1952–2009), Mexican ambient electronic musician
Jorge Reyes (Mexican actor) (1907–1985), Argentine-Mexican actor
Jorge Reyes (Peruvian filmmaker) (born 1938), Lima, Peru
Jorge Reyes (Venezuelan actor) (born 1971), Venezuelan actor and model
Jorge Reyes (writer) (born 1972), Cuban-born, American author
Jorge Reyes (baseball) (born 1987), American pitcher
Jorge D. Reyes, American surgeon and academic

See also
George Reyes, Cuban-American businessman
Jorge Reyes Oregón (born 1991), Mexican footballer